The Sibiu–Brașov–Bacău Motorway is a planned motorway in the central part of Romania, designed to connect Sibiu and Bacău counties, via Brașov.

History and status

Boița – Făgăraș – Brașov sections
From Boița (junction with A1), it will follow the Olt River valley before running through Avrig, Cârțișoara,  Voila  to a junction with A3 east of Făgăraș, with which it intersects until west of Brașov, where there's another junction with A3. The Făgăraș – Brașov section will be shared with A3 motorway.

In 2013, the Romanian government has reportedly changed the plans in order to provide the connection from Sibiu to Bucharest alternative to A1 via Pitești as part of the Trans European Transport Network, thus implementing it as a motorway rather than expressway.

The feasibility study and the technical project for the Boița – Făgăraș section were approved in December 2021 and January 2022, respectively. The total value of the investment was estimated at 7.5 billion RON.

Brașov – Răcăciuni section
From Brașov, the motorway will cross through the plains of the Szekely Land (Ținutul Secuiesc), reaching the cities of Sfântu Gheorghe and Târgu Secuiesc, then cross the Eastern Romanian Carpathians through the Oituz Pass to reach Onești, then the junction with A7 near Răcăciuni towards Bacău (north) and Focșani (south).

The contract for the feasibility study and the technical project of this section of the motorway was signed in May 2020, but the inability of Search Corporation (with whom the contract was signed) to cover the costs of geotechnical studies resulted in a termination of the contract in June 2022.

See also

References

External links
Motorways in Romania 2014–2020 (pdf file)
Map of the planned motorway route between Boița and Făgăraș
Map of proposed routes between Brașov and Bacău County

Proposed roads in Romania
Motorways in Romania